Tillandsia plumosa is a species of flowering plant in the family Bromeliaceae. This species is native to Mexico.

References

 

plumosa
Flora of Mexico
Taxa named by John Gilbert Baker